Le Bal du compte d'Orgel is a French film from 1970. It was the last film directed by Marc Allégret, who was also the producer of this film. It was screened at the 1970 Cannes Film Festival, but wasn't entered into the main competition.

Plot
Based on Raymond Radiguet's book of the same name, posthumously published in 1924, the film concerns a ball hosted by the Comte d'Orgel.

Set in 1920, the Comte hosts a soirée and dance for the upper echelons of Parisian society. One of the guests is a handsome young man named François de Séryeuse (played by Bruno Garcin), who during the course of the ball falls in love with the Comte's wife, Comtesse Mahé (played by Sylvie Fennec).

The Comtesse alerts her husband (the Comte), but he dismisses it, seeing de Séryeuse as childish and common. However, Mahé falls for François, and faints with passion on stage during a performance of The Tempest with François. Mahé continues to dream about him, however she is confined in her marriage.

Cast
 Jean-Claude Brialy: Le comte Anne d'Orgel
 Sylvie Fennec: La comtesse Mahé d'Orgel
 Bruno Garcin: François de Seyrieuse
 Micheline Presle: Madame de Seyrieuse
 Gérard Lartigau: Paul Robin
 Sacha Pitoëff: Le prince Naoumof
 Marpessa Dawn: Marie
 Claude Gensac: Mademoiselle d'Orgel
 Ginette Leclerc: Hortense d'Austerlitz
 Aly Raffy: Mirza
 Marcel Charvey: L'ambassadeur
 Béatrice Chatelier: Amina
 Max Montavon: Un invité
 Wendy Nicholls: Hester

References

1970 films
Adultery in films
French historical drama films
1970s French-language films
1970s historical drama films
Films directed by Marc Allégret
Films set in 1920
Films based on French novels
1970 drama films
1970s French films